Below is a list of Hungarian geographical names in the Burgenland region of Austria.

Allersdorf im Burgenland Kulcsárfalu
Allersgraben Sirokány
Althodis Óhodász
Altschlaining Ószalónak
Andau Mosontarcsa
Antau Selegszántó
Apetlon Mosonbánfalva, Bánfalu
Aschau im Burgenland Hamvasd, Hamusd
Bad Sauerbrunn Savanyúkút
Bad Tatzmannsdorf Tarcsafürdő
Badersdorf Pöszöny
Baumgarten Sopronkertes
Bergwerk Őribánya
Bernstein im Burgenland Borostyánkő
Bildein Beled
Bocksdorf Baksafalu, Baksafalva
Bonisdorf Bónisfalva
Breitenbrunn Fertőszéleskút
Bruckneudorf Királyhida
Bubendorf Lantosfalva
Buchschachen Őribükkösd
Burg Pinkaóvár, Óvár
Burgauberg Burgóhegy
Deutsch Bieling Németbükkös
Deutsch Ehrensdorf Némethásos
Deutsch Gerisdorf Németgyirót
Deutsch Jahrndorf Németjárfalu
Deutsch Kaltenbrunn Némethidegkút
Deutsch Minihof Németlak
Deutsch Schützen Németlövő
Deutsch Tschantschendorf Németcsencs
Deutschkreutz Sopronkeresztúr, Németkeresztúr
Dobersdorf Dobrafalva
Doiber Döbör
Donnerskirchen Fertőfehéregyháza
Dörfl im Burgenland Dérföld
Draßburg Darufalva
Draßmarkt Vámosderecske, Sopronderecske
Dreihütten Háromsátor
Drumling Drumoly
Dürnbach im Burgenland Incéd
Eberau Monyorókerék
Edelstal Nemesvölgy
Edlitz im Burgenland Abdalóc
Eisenberg an der Pinka Csejke
Eisenhüttl Kisvaskút
Eisenstadt Kismarton
Eisenzicken Németciklény
Eltendorf Ókörtvélyes
Forchtenau Fraknó
Forchtenstein Fraknó, Fraknóváralja, Fraknókő
Frankenau Répcesarud, Frankó
Frauenkirchen Boldogasszony
Gaas Pinkakertes
Gamischdorf Ganócs
Gattendorf Lajtakáta, Gáta
Gerersdorf-Sulz Németszentgrót-Sóskútfalu
Girm Küllő
Glashütten bei Langeck im Burgenland Hosszúszeghuta
Glashütten bei Schlaining Szalónakhuta
Glasing Kiskolozsvár
Goberling Góborfalva
Gols Gálos
Grafenschachen Vasárokszállás, Árokszállás
Grieselstein Köröstyén
Gritsch Gercse
Grodnau Grodnó
Großbachselten Nagykarasztos
Großhöflein Nagyhöflány
Großmürbisch Alsómedves
Großmutschen Sopronudvard
Großpetersdorf  Nagyszentmihály
Großwarasdorf Szabadbáránd, Baromlak, Nagybarom
Günseck Gyöngyösfő, Ginzek
Güssing Németújvár
Güttenbach Pinkóc
Hackerberg Vághegy
Hagensdorf Karácsfa
Halbturn Féltorony
Hammerteich Hámortó
Hannersdorf Sámfalva
Harmisch Hovárdos
Haschendorf Hasfalva
Hasendorf im Burgenland Vasnyúlfalu, Vasnyúlfalva
Heiligenbrunn Szentkút
Helenenschacht Ilona akna
Heiligenkreuz im Lafnitztal Rábakeresztú
Henndorf im Burgenland Ercsenye
Heugraben Szénásgödör
Hirm Félszerfalva
Hochart Pinkadombhát, Hochárt
Hochstrass Kisostoros
Höll Pokolfalu
Holling Fertőboz
Holzschlag Vágod
Horitschon Haracsony
Hornstein Szarvkő
Illmitz Illmic
Inzenhof Borosgödör
Jabing Vasjobbágyi
Jennersdorf Gyanafalva
Jois Nyulas
Jormannsdorf Gyimótfalva
Kaisersdorf Császárfalu
Kaisersteinbruch Császárkőbánya
Kalch Mészvölgy
Kalkgruben Mészverem
Karl Répcekároly
Kemeten Vaskomját
Kirchfidisch Egyházasfüzes
Kittsee Köpcsény
Kitzladen Kicléd
Kleinbachselten Kiskarasztos
Kleinhöflein im Burgenland Kishöflány
Kleinfrauenhaid Kisboldogasszony
Kleinmürbisch Felsőmedves
Kleinmutschen Pervány
Kleinpetersdorf Kisszentmihály
Kleinwarasdorf Borisfalva, Kisbarom
Kleinzicken Kisciklény
Klingenbach Kelénpatak
Klostermarienberg Borsmonostor
Kobersdorf Kabold
Kogl im Burgenland Kúpfalva
Kohfidisch Gyepűfüzes
Königsdorf Királyfalva
Kotezicken Sárosszék
Krensdorf Tormafalu
Kroatisch Ehrensdorf Horváthásos
Kroatisch Geresdorf Gyirót
Kroatisch Minihof Malomháza
Kroatisch Tschantschendorf Horvátcsencs
Krobotek Horvátfalu
Kroisegg Hidasrákosd
Krottendorf bei Güssing Békafalu
Krottendorf bei Neuhaus am Klausenbach Békató
Kukmirn Kukmér
Kulm im Burgenland Kólom
Lackenbach Lakompak
Lackendorf Lakfalva
Landsee Lánzsér
Langeck im Burgenland Hosszúszeg
Lebenbrunn Létér
Leithaprodersdorf Lajtapordány
Liebing Rendek
Limbach im Burgenland Hárspatak
Lindgraben Kishársfalva
Litzelsdorf Lődös
Lockenhaus Léka
Loipersbach im Burgenland Lépesfalva
Loipersdorf im Burgenland Lipótfalva
Loretto Lorettom
Luising Lovászad
Lutzmannsburg Locsmánd
Mannersdorf an der Rabnitz Répcekethely
Maria Bild Máriakép
Mariasdorf Máriafalva
Markt Allhau Alhó
Markt Neuhodis Városhodász, Újhodász
Markt Sankt Martin Sopronszentmárton
Marz Márcfalva
Mattersburg Nagymarton
Miedlingsdorf Mérem
Minihof-Liebau Liba
Mischendorf Pinkamiske
Mitterpullendorf Középpulya
Mogersdorf Nagyfalva
Mönchhof Barátfalu, Barátudvar
Mönchmeierhof Barátmajor
Mörbisch am See Medgyes
Moschendorf Nagysároslak, Német-Sároslak
Mühlgraben Malomgödör
Müllendorf Szárazvám
Nebersdorf Ligvánd
Neckenmarkt Sopronnyék, Nyék
Neuberg im Burgenland Újhegy
Neudauberg Magashegy
Neudorf bei Landsee Lánzsérújfalu, Kisújfalu
Neudorf bei Parndorf Mosonújfalu
Neudörfl Lajtaszentmiklós
Neufeld an der Leitha Lajtaújfalu
Neuhaus am Klausenbach Vasdobra
Neuhaus in der Wart Őridobra
Neumarkt an der Raab Farkasdifalva
Neumarkt im Tauchental Felsőkethely
Neusiedl am See Nezsider
Neusiedl bei Güssing Felsőújlak
Neustift an der Lafnitz Lapincsújtelek
Neustift an der Rosalia Újtelek
Neustift bei Güssing Újtelep
Neustift bei Schlaining Szalónakújtelek
Neutal Sopronújlak, Nyujtál
Nickelsdorf Miklóshalma
Nikitsch Füles
Oberberg Felsőkismartonhegy
Oberbildein Felsőbeled
Oberdorf im Burgenland Őrállás
Oberdrosen Rábaőr, Felsőstrázsa
Oberkohlstätten Felsőszénégető
Oberloisdorf Felsőlászló
Oberpetersdorf Felsőpéterfa
Oberpullendorf Felsőpulya
Oberrabnitz Felsőrámóc
Oberschützen Felsőlövő
Oberwart Felsőőr
Oggau am Neusiedler See Oka
Olbendorf Óbér
Ollersdorf im Burgenland Barátfalva
Oslip Oszlop
Pama Lajtakörtvélyes, Mosonkörtvélyes
Pamhagen Pomogy
Parndorf Pándorfalu
Pilgersdorf Pörgölény, Pergelin
Pinkafeld Pinkafő
Piringsdorf Répcebónya
Podersdorf am See Pátfalu
Podgoria Hármasfalu
Podler Polányfalu, Polányfalva
Poppendorf im Burgenland Patafalva
Pöttelsdorf Petőfalva
Pöttsching Pecsenyéd
Potzneusiedl Lajtafalu
Punitz Pónic
Purbach am Neusiedler See Feketeváros
Raiding Doborján
Rattersdorf Rőtfalva
Rauchwart Rábort
Rauhriegel Füsthegy
Rax Raks
Rechnitz Rohonc
Redlschlag Vörösvágás, Újvörösvágás
Rehrgraben Őzgödör, Prástya
Reinersdorf Zsámánd
Rettenbach Mencsér
Riedlingsdorf Rödöny
Ritzing Récény
Rohr im Burgenland Nád
Rohrbach an der Teich Jobbágyújfalu
Rohrbach bei Mattersburg Fraknónádasd
Rohrbrunn Nádkút
Rosenberg Rózsahegy
Rosendorf Pócsfalu
Rotenturm an der Pinka Vasvörösvár
Rudersdorf Radafalva
Rumpersdorf Rumpód
Rust Ruszt
Salmannsdorf Salamonfalva
Sankt Andrä am Zicksee Mosonszentandrás
Sankt Georgen am Leithagebirge Lajtaszentgyörgy
Sankt Kathrein im Burgenland Pósaszentkatalin
Sankt Margarethen im Burgenland Szentmargitbánya, Margita
Sankt Martin an der Raab Rábaszentmárton
Sankt Martin in der Wart Őriszentmárton
Sankt Michael im Burgenland Pusztaszentmihály
Sankt Nikolaus Várszentmiklós
Sauerbrunn Savanyúkút
Schachendorf Csajta
Schallendorf im Burgenland Salafa
Schandorf Csém
Schattendorf Somfalva
Schmiedrait Határfő
Schönherrn Szépúr
Schreibersdorf Buglóc
Schützen am Gebirge Sérc
Schwabenhof Nemestelek
Schwendgraben Répcefő
Siegendorf Cinfalva
Sieggraben Szikra
Siget in der Wart Őrisziget
Sigleß Siklósd
Spitzzicken Oláhciklény
Stadtschlaining Városszalónak
Stegersbach Szentelek
Steinbach im Burgenland Kőpatak
Steinberg-Dörfl Répcekőhalom-Dérföld
Steinbrunn Büdöskút
Steinfurt Lipóc
Steingraben Bányácska
Stinatz Pásztorháza
Stoob Csáva
Stöttera Selegd, Stodra
Stotzing Lajtaszék
Strebersdorf Répcemicske
Strem Strém
Stuben Edeháza
Sulz im Burgenland Sóskút, Sóskútfalu
Sulzriegel Sóshegy
Sumetendorf Szombatfa
Tadten Mosontétény
Tauchen Fehérpatak
Tauka Tóka
Tobaj Tobaj
Trausdorf an der Wulka Darázsfalu
Tschanigraben Sándorhegy
Tschurndorf Csóronfalva
Tudersdorf Taródcsencs
Unterberg-Eisenstadt Alsókismartonhegy
Unterbildein Alsóbeled
Unterfrauenhaid Lók
Unterkohlstätten Alsószénégető
Unterloisdorf Alsólászló
Unterpetersdorf Alsópéterfa
Unterpullendorf Alsópulya
Unterrabnitz Alsórámóc
Unterschützen Alsólövő
Unterwart Alsóőr
Urbersdorf Orbánfalu
Walbersdorf Borbolya
Wallendorf Lapincsolaszi
Wallern im Burgenland Valla
Weichselbaum Badafalva
Weiden am See Védeny
Weiden bei Rechnitz Bándol
Weinberg im Burgenland Borhegy
Weingraben Borosd
Welgersdorf Velege
Welten Velike
Weppersdorf Veperd
Wiesen Rétfalu
Wiesfleck Újrétfalu
Willersdorf Villámos
Wimpassing an der Leitha Vimpác
Winden am See Sásony
Windisch Minihof Kistótlak
Winten Pinkatótfalu
Wolfau Vasfarkasfalva
Woppendorf Várújfalu
Wörterberg Vörthegy
Wulkaprodersdorf Vulkapordány
Zagersdorf Zárány
Zahling Újkörtvélyes
Zemendorf Zemenye
Zillingtal Völgyfalva, Völgyfalu
Zuberbach Szabar
Zurndorf Zurány

See also 
 Hungarian exonyms
 List of European exonyms

 
 
Burgenland
Hungarian exonyms in Burgenland
Names of places in Austria